The Almirante Clemente class of destroyer escorts is a class of warships built for several countries. The class was designed by Ansaldo for the Venezuelan Naval Forces, currently Venezuelan Navy, in the 1950s to complement its .

The Venezuelan Navy has 6 ships originally ordered, with Indonesia had two ships and Portugal had one ship of this design. In the Portuguese Navy, these ships are referred as patrol boats. In the 1950s Venezuelan Navy, the ships were classified as DLV (Destroyer Light Vessel) or light destroyers, in the 1980s were reclassified as ASW frigate, and are currently classified as coast guard vessels.

Technical specifications
These ships include among their specs these characteristics:
 Alumite superstructure.
 Air conditioned in all areas.
 Retractable Denny-Brown fin stabilisers

The usage of the fin stabilizer is a weapons systems support device to stabilize the ship making it a more steady gun platform in rough seas.

Venezuelan Navy

Ships

The construction contracts for these destroyers were awarded on 25 January 1954, and their names were an homage to Venezuelan war of independence heroes who lie at Panteón Nacional:
D-12 Almirante Clemente, named after Lino de Clemente, an officer of the Spanish and Venezuelan navies and prominent politician in early Venezuela. Sunk in 2009.
D-13 General Flores, named after Juan José Flores, Venezuelan soldier, as well as the first president of Ecuador. Sunk in 1978.
D-22 General Moran, named after José Trinidad Moran, a soldier who fought with Simón Bolívar's independence movement. transferred to Coast Guard. Ship has been removed from service and partially been dismantled as of 2011.
D-23 Almirante Brión, named after Luis Brión, an admiral in Bolivar's navy. Sunk in 1978.
D-32 General Austria, named after José de Austria, a general under Francisco de Miranda's command. Sunk in 1976.
D-33 Almirante Garcia, named after José María García, a naval officer under Juan Bautista Arismendi. Sunk in 1977.

Fleet Arrangement
First Division
D11 Nueva Esparta
D12 Almirante Clemente (Almirante Clemente class)
D13 General Flores (Almirante Clemente class)
Second Division
D21 Zulia (Nueva Esparta class)
D22 General Moran (Almirante Clemente class)
D23 Almirante Brión (Almirante Clemente class)
Third Division
D31 Aragua (Nueva Esparta class)
D32 General Austria (Almirante Clemente class)
D33 Almirante Garcia (Almirante Clemente class)

Indonesian Navy

Two destroyer escorts of similar design was built for Indonesian Navy by Ansaldo. Both were completed in May 1958. They were never modernized and was stricken in 1978. In comparison with its Venezuelan sisters, the Indonesian ships had lighter anti-aircraft armaments which consisted of three 20 mm in twin mounts. They were named after National Hero of Indonesia:
Imam Bondjol (250), named after Tuanku Imam Bonjol, an Islamic figure from West Sumatra who fought against Dutch colonial forces in the Padri War. Its pennant number was later changed to 355.
Surapati (251), named after Untung Surapati, a Balinese war fighter who led several rebellions against the Dutch East India Company. Its pennant number was later changed to 356.

Ships in class

Venezuelan Navy

Indonesian Navy

References

External links

 web site from a Checolovaquian naval modeller
 Ships built at Livorno
 Miramar Ship Index: Ships made in Italy by Ansaldo
 Basic Spec of Clemente Class Ships
 A complete list of Venezuelan Navy ships
 A complete list of Indonesian Navy Ships
 exAlmirante Clemente half-sunken in 2011 Puerto Cabello, Venezuela
 Partially dismantled exGeneral Jose Trinidad Moran in 2011 in Puerto Cabello, Venezuela

 
Destroyer classes
Ships built by Gio. Ansaldo & C.